Dragonsnake can refer to:

 Xenodermus javanicus, a species of snake in the family Xenodermidae
 a Dragon snake (Star Wars), a fictional creature from the Star Wars franchise